Longtian railway station is a railway station located in Guantian District, Tainan, Taiwan. It is located on the West Coast line and is operated by the Taiwan Railways Administration.

Around the station
 Jacana Ecological Education Park

References

1902 establishments in Taiwan
Railway stations opened in 1902
Railway stations in Tainan
Railway stations served by Taiwan Railways Administration